Val Lewton: The Man in the Shadows (also known as Martin Scorsese Presents: Val Lewton – The Man in the Shadows) is a documentary tribute to Val_Lewton, the producer of a series of distinctive low-budget horror films for RKO Radio Pictures, presented and narrated by director Martin Scorsese.

Films discussed

RKO films 
Cat People (1942)
I Walked With a Zombie (1943)
The Leopard Man (1943)
The Seventh Victim (1943)
The Ghost Ship (1943)
The Curse of the Cat People (1944)
Mademoiselle Fifi (1944)
Youth Runs Wild (1944)
The Body Snatcher (1945)
Isle of the Dead (1945)
Bedlam (1946)

References

External links

2007 television films
2007 films
American documentary films
Documentary films about Hollywood, Los Angeles
Documentary films about film directors and producers
2000s American films